The boys' 500 metres speed skating competition of the 2016 Winter Youth Olympics was held at Hamar Olympic Hall on 13 February 2016.

Results
The races were held at 12:39.

References 

Boys' 500m